James Edwin "Ted" Meredith (November 14, 1891 – November 2, 1957) was an American athlete, winner of two gold medals at the 1912 Summer Olympics.

Meredith made the 1912 Olympic team shortly after his graduation from Williamson Free School of Mechanical Trades in 1911, whilst he was a student at Mercersburg Academy under Scots-American coach Jimmy Curran. In Stockholm, he won a gold medal in the 800 m run with a world record 1:51.9. He ran on to the 880 yard mark and also set a world record for that distance, with a 1:52.5. He won another gold medal on the 4 × 400 m relay team, also taking fourth in the 400 metres competition.

Williamson Free School of Mechanical Trades now has the largest repository of Olympic great Meredith memorabilia in existence thanks to Jack Lemon, author of the book Immortal of the Cinder Path – The Saga of James 'Ted' Meredith who donated his entire collection of Meredith memorabilia recently.

After Stockholm, Meredith entered the University of Pennsylvania. He was the IC4A 440 yards champion from 1914 to 1916 and the 880 yard champion in 1914 and 1915. He also won the AAU 440 yard title in 1914 and 1915. In 1916, he set a world record in the 440 yards of 47.4, which wasn't broken until 1928. At the same year he lowered his own world 880 yard record to 1:52.2. In April 1915 he ran the last lap for the University of Pennsylvania team that broke the world mile relay record. Requiring a time of 48 3/5 seconds he proceeded to run 48 2/5. Also part of the quartet was Donald Lippincott.

Meredith retired from competition in 1917 and served in the army during World War I. He made a comeback for the 1920 Summer Olympics, where he was eliminated in the semifinal of the 400 metres competition and ran on the relay team that finished fourth in the 4 × 400 m relay event.

After the second retiring from competition, he became a real estate broker, but retained an active interest in athletics. In 1924 he attended the Olympic Games in Paris as a reporter, working for the Christy Walsh Syndicate. In 1928 he was hired as an assistant coach at the University of Pennsylvania, under Lawson Robertson. In 1936 he attended the Olympic Games in Berlin as the coach of the Czechoslovakia team. During 1937 and 1938 he trained the Cuban team for the Central American Games.

Meredith's funeral service was held in Haddonfield, New Jersey. Attendees were a roll call of early 20th century American and Pennsylvanian sports, including Jimmy Curran, Earl Eby, Donald Lippincott, Sherman Landers, Wallace McCurdy, Larry Brown, Joe Lockwood, Robert Bolger, Joe Berry, Allie Miller, Ed Harter, and Paul Costello.

References

External links

1891 births
1957 deaths
People from Delaware County, Pennsylvania
American people of Welsh descent
American male sprinters
American male middle-distance runners
Athletes (track and field) at the 1912 Summer Olympics
Athletes (track and field) at the 1920 Summer Olympics
Olympic gold medalists for the United States in track and field
World record setters in athletics (track and field)
Sportspeople from Camden, New Jersey
Penn Quakers men's track and field athletes
Mercersburg Academy alumni
United States Army personnel of World War I
Medalists at the 1912 Summer Olympics
Olympic coaches